Baurioidea is a superfamily of therocephalian therapsids. It includes advanced therocephalians such as Regisaurus and Bauria. The superfamily was named by South African paleontologist Robert Broom in 1911. Bauriamorpha, named by D. M. S. Watson and Alfred Romer in 1956, is a junior synonym of Baurioidea.

Many baurioids were once placed in a group called Scaloposauria. Scaloposaurs were characterized by their small size and reduced postorbital bar (a strut of bone behind the eye socket). Scaloposauria is no longer recognized as a valid taxon because it likely represents juvenile forms of many groups of therocephalians. Most scaloposaurs, including Scaloposaurus and Regisaurus, are now classified in various positions within Bauroidea.

Many therocephalians once classified as scaloposaurians are now considered basal baurioids. The classification of these species is uncertain, as there have been no comprehensive phylogenetic analyses of scaloposaurian taxa. The validity of many of these species is questionable, as future studies may find some to be synonymous. Below is a list of these taxa:
 Ictidosuchoides
 Scaloposaurus
 Tetracynodon
 Zorillodontops
 Homodontosaurus
 Ictidosuchops
 Nanictidops
 Scaloporhinus
 Scaloposuchus
 Choerosaurus
 Ictidostoma
 Ictidosuchus
 Malasaurus
 Chlynovia
 Karenites
 Perplexisaurus
 Scalopodon
 Scalopodontes

References

External links
Bauroidea in the Paleobiology Database

 
Permian first appearances
Triassic extinctions
Vertebrate superfamilies